XXXX Panzer Corps was a tank corps in the German Army during World War II.

History
The XXXX. Armeekorps was formed on 26 January 1940 in Lubeck in the Wehrkreis X. 
It took part in the invasions of France and Greece before being sent to the Eastern Front.
On 15 September 1940 it was converted into a motorized corps under the name XXXX. Armeekorps (motorisiert) and was renamed XXXX. Panzerkorps on 9 July 1942.

The XXXX Panzer Corps fought at Kharkov, the advance to the Don River, and to the Terek in the Caucasus. The corps later withdrew toward Rostov and later into Romania.

The corps was transferred to East Prussia and withdraw toward Memel and ended the war in central Silesia.

Commanders 
 15.02.1940 - 14.01.1942 : Georg Stumme
 15.01.1942 - 16.01.1942 : Hans Zorn
 16.02.1942 - 09.07.1942 : Georg Stumme
 20.07.1942 - 30.09.1942 : Leo Freiherr Geyr von Schweppenburg
 30.09.1942 - 13.11.1942 : Gustav Fehn
 13.11.1942 - 01.10.1943 : Siegfried Henrici
 01.10.1943 - 11.11.1943 : Ferdinand Schörner
 12.11.1943 - 15.11.1943 : Hermann Balck 
 19.11.1943 - 26.11.1943 : Heinrich Eberbach 
 27.11.1943 - 31.01.1944 : Ferdinand Schörner 
 01.02.1944 - 31.08.1944 : Otto von Knobelsdorff
 01.09.1944 - 08.05.1945 : Siegfried Henrici

References

Panzer corps of Germany in World War II
Military units and formations disestablished in 1945